Aleksey Viktorovich Merinov (born 25 March 1959) is a Russian self-taught painter and cartoonist.

Biography 
Merinov was born in Moscow. He served in the Soviet Navy. In his youth he worked as a graphic designer in the Romen Theatre.

Since 1988 he has been working at the newspaper Moskovskij Komsomolets. He illustrated more than two dozen books. Among them: the Criminal Code and the Tax Code, Collection of recipes, a collection of quotations by Vladimir Putin. He has released over a dozen albums with his pictures.

He is a fan of CSKA Moscow.

References

External links
 Галерея карикатур Алексея Меринова
 Aleksey Merinov on Facebook
 Иллюстрированный Уголовный кодекс Российской Федерации

1959 births
Living people
Artists from Moscow
Russian caricaturists
Soviet journalists
Russian male journalists
Soviet caricaturists
Russian Navy personnel